Chimarra aberrans is a species of fingernet caddisfly in the family Philopotamidae. It is found in Southeast Asia.

References 

Trichoptera
Insects described in 1935